The Sonatina in F is a composition for solo piano in two movements, attributed to Ludwig van Beethoven (listed as Anh. 5 No. 2 in the Kinsky–Halm Catalogue), though doubtful.

Structure

The composition is in two movements:

 Allegro assai
 Rondo: Allegro

Both movements are in  time. Most of the first movement is in sixteenth notes and the second movement is in eighth notes.

External links 
 

 

Piano solos by Ludwig van Beethoven
Beethoven
Compositions in F major
Beethoven: spurious and doubtful works